Orphanostigma angustale is a moth in the family Crambidae. It was described by George Hampson in 1893. It is found on New Guinea and in Australia, where it has been recorded from Queensland.

References

Moths described in 1893
Spilomelinae